Johannes Adriaan Retief (born 10 October 1995) is a Namibian rugby union player for the n national team and for the  in the Currie Cup and the Rugby Challenge. His regular position is lock or flank.

Rugby career

Retief was born in Windhoek.

References

External links
 

1995 births
Living people
Leopards (rugby union) players
Namibia international rugby union players
Namibian rugby union players
Rugby union flankers
Rugby union locks
Rugby union players from Windhoek
Griquas (rugby union) players